Athicode is an old junction village in Palakkad district of Kerala state, India. It is the main junction to the towns of Palakkad (20 km), Pollachi (25 km), Coimbatore (35 km) and Chittur (16 km). Half of the village is in Kozhinjampara panchayat and other half in Nallepilly panchayat.

References 

Villages in Palakkad district